Trewoodloe is a  hamlet near Golberdon in the parish of South Hill, Cornwall, England, United Kingdom.

References

Hamlets in Cornwall